General Frank S. Besson-class logistics support vessels (LSV) are the largest powered watercraft in the United States Army, and are designed to give the Army a global strategic capability to deliver its vehicles and cargo.

Design
Named in honor of Gen. Frank S. Besson Jr., former Chief of Transportation, U.S. Army, these ships have bow and stern ramps and the ability to beach themselves, giving them the ability to discharge 900 short tons of vehicles and cargo over the shore in as little as four feet of water, or 2,000 short tons as an intra-theater line haul roll-on/roll-off cargo ship. The vessel's cargo deck is designed to handle any vehicle in the US Army inventory and can carry up to 15 M1 Abrams main battle tanks or 82 ISO standard containers.

Subclasses
The Robert T. Kuroda is the lead vessel of a new subclass of the Frank S. Besson class called LSV (MOD). The Kuroda, named after Robert T. Kuroda, and its sister ship, the Smalls, named after Robert Smalls, are generally similar to the rest of the class except that the ships are  longer than the other ships of the class. This is due to a more streamlined "visor" bow that hides the front ramp and allows for the vessels to move through rough water more easily. While these ships have the same main deck area as the rest of the class—— however they displace , can make  of water a day, have incinerators for burning trash, are taller than the traditional Besson-class LSVs, and have 25% more horsepower.

Related classes
The Philippine Navy commissioned two s during the early 1990s. These ships were based on a helicopter-capable variant of the General Frank S. Besson Jr.-class logistics support vessel.
MWT-03

Ships
  – 335th Transportation Detachment, 7th Expeditionary Transportation Brigade
  – 489th Transportation Detachment, USAR
  – 805th Transportation Detachment, 8th Theater Sustainment Command
  – 1099th Transportation Detachment, 7th Expeditionary Transportation Brigade
  – 411th Transportation Detachment, 1st Theater Sustainment Command
  – USAR
  – USAR
  – 605th Transportation Detachment, 8th Theater Sustainment Command

Gallery

References

External links
 Frank S Besson Class LSV Logistic Support Vessel
 LSVs at globalsecurity.org
 Photo gallery: Family tour aboard the LSV-7 Kuroda | The Honolulu Advertiser
 LSV-8 USAV MG Roberts Smalls – a set on Flickr
 Army Commissions Vessel Named after African-American Civil War Hero, S.C. Statesman

Ships of the United States Army
Landing craft
 
Auxiliary transport ship classes